is a retired Japanese athlete who specialised in the pole vault. She was the first Japanese female vaulter to jump over 4 metres. She won multiple medals at the continental level.

She has personal bests of 4.21 metres outdoors (2003) and 4.30 metres indoors (2002).

Personal bests

Competition record

National titles
Japanese Championships
Pole vault: 1998, 1999, 2003

References

External links

Masumi Ono at JAAF  (archived)

1975 births
Living people
Sportspeople from Hokkaido
Japanese female pole vaulters
Asian Games silver medalists for Japan
Asian Games medalists in athletics (track and field)
Athletes (track and field) at the 1998 Asian Games
Athletes (track and field) at the 2002 Asian Games
Medalists at the 1998 Asian Games
Medalists at the 2002 Asian Games
World Athletics Championships athletes for Japan
Japan Championships in Athletics winners
Hokkaido University of Education alumni